Ronald T. Raines is an American chemical biologist. He is the Roger and Georges Firmenich Professor of Natural Products Chemistry at the Massachusetts Institute of Technology. He is known for using ideas and methods of physical organic chemistry to solve important problems in biology.

Education
Raines was born and raised in the New Jersey suburbs of New York City. His father was a Ph.D. chemist, having worked with Charles O. Beckman at Columbia University. Raines graduated from West Essex High School in North Caldwell, New Jersey. He received Sc.B. degrees in chemistry and biology at the Massachusetts Institute of Technology, doing undergraduate research with Christopher T. Walsh on pyridoxal phosphate-dependent enzymes. He earned A.M. and Ph.D. degrees in chemistry at Harvard University for work with Jeremy R. Knowles on catalysis by triosephosphate isomerase. Raines was a Helen Hay Whitney postdoctoral fellow with William J. Rutter in the Department of Biochemistry and Biophysics at the University of California, San Francisco, where he cloned and expressed the gene encoding bovine pancreatic ribonuclease.

Career
Raines was a member of the faculty at the University of Wisconsin–Madison from 1989 until 2017. There, he was the Henry A. Lardy Professor of Biochemistry, Linus Pauling Professor of Chemical Biology, and a Professor of Chemistry. In 2009, he was a Visiting Associate in Chemistry at Caltech; in 2014, he was the Givaudan–Karrer Distinguished Visiting Professor at the Universität Zürich. In 2017, he returned to Cambridge, Massachusetts to join the faculty of his alma mater, MIT. Altogether, he has mentored more than 100 graduate students and postdoctorates.

Raines and his coworkers have made the followinga contributions.
 Revelation of the basis for the conformational stability of collagen, which is the most abundant protein in animals. This work led to the discovery that unappreciated chemical forces—the n→π* interaction and C5 hydrogen bond—contribute to the stability of nearly every protein. His hyperstable collagens are in preclinical trials for the detection and treatment of wounds.
 Discovery of how to endow an otherwise innocuous human RNA-cleaving enzyme with toxicity that is specific for cancer cells. Such a ribonuclease is in a human clinical trial as an anti-cancer agent.
 Mechanistic insight on cellular redox homeostasis and on imperatives for the uptake of cationic proteins and peptides by mammalian cells.
 Invention of chemical processes to synthesize proteins and to convert crude biomass into useful fuels and chemicals, and fluorogenic probes to image the uptake of molecules into living cells.
Raines serves on the editorial advisory boards of the journals ACS Chemical Biology; Bioconjugate Chemistry; Current Opinion in Chemical Biology; Peptide Science; Protein Engineering, Design & Selection; and Protein Science. He was the Chair of the NIH study section that evaluates grant applications in synthetic and biological chemistry.

Awards and Honors

Helen Hay Whitney Fellow
Searle Scholar Award
Presidential Young Investigator Award
Shaw Scientist Award
Pfizer Award in Enzyme Chemistry, ACS
Guggenheim Fellow
AAAS Fellow
Arthur C. Cope Scholar Award, ACS
Emil Thomas Kaiser Award
Royal Society of Chemistry Fellow
Rao Makineni Lectureship
Welch Lectureship
Repligen Corporation Award in Chemistry of Biological Processes, ACS
Jeremy Knowles Award, RSC
Humboldt Research Award
Ralph F. Hirschmann Award in Peptide Chemistry, ACS
Member, National Academy of Inventors
Vincent du Vigneaud Award
Royal Society of Biology Fellow
Max Bergmann Medal
Member, American Academy of Arts and Sciences
Khorana Prize, RSC
Biopolymers Murray Goodman Memorial Prize, ACS

References

External links
The Raines laboratory website

Sources
 
 MIT Department of Chemistry

21st-century American biochemists
1958 births
Living people
Harvard University alumni
Fellows of the Royal Society of Biology
Fellows of the Royal Society of Chemistry
Massachusetts Institute of Technology School of Science alumni
West Essex High School alumni